Talbot County is a county located in the west central portion of the U.S. state of Georgia. The 2020 census showed a population of 5,733. The county seat and largest city is Talbotton.

History
Talbot County was created from a portion of Muscogee County by a December 14, 1827 act of the Georgia General Assembly. It was named after the late Georgia governor Matthew Talbot. Taylor County was created from a portion of Talbot County in 1852.

Geography

The county straddles the fall line of the Eastern U.S., and thus northern areas of the county are hillier compared to southern areas of the county. The Fall Line Freeway runs across the southern portion of the county, following Georgia State Route 96 from Geneva to Junction City. The far northern portion of the county is part of the Pine Mountain Range, with elevations in this areas exceeding 1,000 ft on the highest peaks of the mountains.

The northeastern three-quarters of Talbot County is located in the Upper Flint River sub-basin of the Apalachicola-Chattahoochee-Flint River Basin. The southwestern quarter, west of Junction City, is located in the Middle Chattahoochee River-Walter F. George Lake sub-basin, while a narrow sliver of the western border, east of Waverly Hall, is located in the Middle Chattahoochee River-Lake Harding sub-basin.

Major highways

  U.S. Route 27 Alternate
  U.S. Route 80
  State Route 22
  State Route 36
  State Route 41
  State Route 85
  State Route 85 Alternate
  State Route 96
  State Route 116
  State Route 190
  State Route 208
  State Route 240
  State Route 315
  State Route 540 (Fall Line Freeway)

Adjacent counties
 Upson County - northeast
 Taylor County - southeast
 Marion County - south
 Chattahoochee County - southwest
 Muscogee County - west-southwest
 Harris County - west
 Meriwether County - north

Railroads
 CSX Fitzgerald Subdivision
 Norfolk Southern Columbus District

Demographics

2020 census

As of the 2020 United States census, there were 5,733 people, 2,809 households, and 1,849 families residing in the county.

2010 census
As of the 2010 United States Census, there were 6,865 people, 2,832 households, and 1,904 families residing in the county. The racial makeup of the county was 59.2% black or African American, 39.0% white, 0.3% American Indian, 0.1% Asian, 0.4% from other races, and 1.0% from two or more races. Those of Hispanic or Latino origin made up 1.3% of the population. In terms of ancestry, 10.4% were Irish, 7.6% were English, 5.8% were Subsaharan African, and 2.7% were American.

Of the 2,832 households, 28.4% had children under the age of 18 living with them, 42.6% were married couples living together, 19.2% had a female householder with no husband present, 32.8% were non-families, and 28.9% of all households were made up of individuals. The average household size was 2.42 and the average family size was 2.98. The median age was 45.6 years.

The median income for a household in the county was $33,873 and the median income for a family was $43,694. Males had a median income of $41,651 versus $24,750 for females. The per capita income for the county was $18,007. About 18.2% of families and 23.5% of the population were below the poverty line, including 31.7% of those under age 18 and 20.8% of those age 65 or over.

Education
The Talbot County School District holds pre-school to grade twelve, and consists of one building with 48 full-time teachers and 792 students. The district headquarters is in Talbotton.

Communities

Cities
 Talbotton (county seat)
 Woodland
 Junction City
 Geneva
 Manchester (part)

Unincorporated communities
 Box Springs
 Centerville
 Po Biddy Crossroads
 Tax Crossroads

Politics
Like most majority-African-American counties in Georgia, Talbot is a reliably Democratic  county. Between 1880 and 2020, Talbot County has only voted Republican three times, although it also voted for American Independent segregationist George Wallace in 1968.

See also

 National Register of Historic Places listings in Talbot County, Georgia
List of counties in Georgia

References

External links
 Georgia.gov info for Talbot County
 GeorgiaInfo Talbot County Courthouse History

 
Georgia (U.S. state) counties
1827 establishments in Georgia (U.S. state)
Populated places established in 1827
Black Belt (U.S. region)
Majority-minority counties in Georgia